Peltophryne is a genus of true toads in the family Bufonidae, from the Greater Antilles (Cuba, Isla de Juventud, Hispaniola, Puerto Rico). With ten endemic species, Cuba hosts the highest diversity. Hispaniola has three endemics and Puerto Rico and the Virgin Islands combined has one.

Description
The skull is as long as wide and contains some unique osteological features (thickened dermal tissue covering the snout and usually ossified into a pair of rostral bones, and squamosal-maxillary articulation). These are considered to be derived characters that set these toads apart from other bufonids.

Taxonomy
The genus was erected by Leopold Fitzinger in 1843, but placed in synonymy with Bufo by Albert Günther in 1859. Subsequent work has considered Peltophryne either as a valid genus, a subgenus, or a synonym of Bufo. At present, treating Peltophryne as a valid genus has largely been accepted based on both morphological characters and genetic evidence, but treating it as a subgenus of Bufo still has a small following.

Species
There are 14 species in this genus:

Conservation
The International Union for Conservation of Nature has assessed many of the species as "Critically Endangered" (Peltophryne florentinoi, Peltophryne fluviatica, and Peltophryne lemur) or "Endangered" (Peltophryne cataulaciceps, Peltophryne fracta, and Peltophryne longinasus). The only surviving wild population of Peltophryne lemur has been supported by captive bred animals.

References

 
Amphibian genera
Amphibians of the Caribbean